Kencia Marseille (born 8 November 1980) is a Haitian women's association football player who plays as a defender.

External links 
 

1980 births
Living people
Haitian women's footballers
Haiti women's international footballers
Women's association football defenders